The 1991 430 km of Mexico City was the seventh round of the 1991 World Sportscar Championship season, taking place at Autodromo Hermanos Rodriguez, Mexico.  It took place on October 6, 1991.

Official results
Class winners in bold.  Cars failing to complete 90% of the winner's distance marked as Not Classified (NC).

Statistics
 Pole Position - Philippe Alliot (#5 Peugeot Talbot Sport) - 1:19.229
 Fastest Lap - Michael Schumacher (#2 Team Sauber Mercedes) - 1:21.611
 Average Speed - 173.964 km/h

External links
 WSPR-Racing - 1991 Mexico City results

Mexico City
Mexico City
6 Hours of Mexico